Hillingdon Borough Football Club are a semi-professional football club based in Ruislip, in the London Borough of Hillingdon. The club is affiliated to the Middlesex County Football Association. Its name was revived in 1990 from the original club, which had been based in Yiewsley.

History

Historic club
The first club was founded as Yiewsley F.C. in 1872 after a meeting of eight local businessmen who met at the instigation of Freddie Clinch, a baker of Fairfield Road, Yiewsley who provided the majority of the financial backing for the venture.

In the late 1880s and 1890 Yiewsley was fielding two teams, Yiewsley Star and Yiewsley Unity. They were competing in local games and in the West Middlesex Challenge Cup. By the 1891–92 season Yiewsley Star were the only Yiewsley team playing matches. In the 1893–94 season Yiewsley Star were renamed Yiewsley F.C and continued competing in local games and in the West Middlesex Cup.

In the 1904–05 season Yiewsley were runners up in the Uxbridge and District Junior League. Yiewsley entered the FA Cup competition for the first time in the 1908–09 season. Having received a bye in the preliminary round after the withdrawal of Reading Amateurs, Yiewsley were defeated in the first qualifying round 2–1 at home by Aylesbury United on 3 October 1908.

In the 1911–12 season Yiewsley were undefeated winners of the Uxbridge Junior League and Uxbridge and District League Cup winners. At the start of the 1912–13 season they were playing at Sutton Meadow, Edgar Road, Yiewsley. By early November 1912 the ground had been renamed Star Meadow. At the end of the 1913–14 season Yiewsley were celebrating being 1912–13 and 1913–14 champions of the West Middlesex League and the Hounslow and District League. This successful period of junior football ended with the coming of the First World War in August 1914.

In the 1919–20 season Yiewsley entered senior football, playing in the Great Western Suburban League. They opened the season on 31 August 1919 at home against Chesham United in front of 700 spectators. In August 1920 Yiewsley transferred its home ground from Edgar Road to Trout Lane, but retained the name 'Star Meadow' for the new ground. A trial 'Stripes v Sashes' charity game took place on 21 August 1920 and a friendly game against Arabian United took place on 28 August. Yiewsley's first league game at the new Star Meadow took place on 11 September 1920 in the Great Western Suburban League First Division against the 1st Grenadier Guards, ending in a 1–1 draw.

The 1920s proved to be a period of significant financial instability for Yiewsley. In February 1922 the Great Western Suburban League granted Yiewsley a loan of £20 to help with their debts, in particular their ground rent. At Yiewsley's annual meeting on 20 June 1923 it was reported that the football club ended the 1922–23 season just over £54   
in debt. Despite their financial difficulties Yiewsley were able to finish runners-up in the Great Western Suburban League in the 1924–25 season. However Yiewsley ended the 1925–26 season with total receipts of only £325. In the 1926–27 season Yiewsley were admitted into the Spartan League Division II but by the November were in financial difficulties and withdrew from the league.

After the 1926 collapse Yiewsley returned to junior football, joining the Uxbridge and District League Division III in the 1927–28 season as Yiewsley Juniors. In the next season 1928–29 they finished as Division I champions. In the 1929–30 season Yiewsley Juniors played in both the Uxbridge and District Division I and the Great Western Suburban League. In the 1930–31 season Yiewsley changed their name to Yiewsley and West Drayton F.C. in honour of the recently created Yiewsley and West Drayton Urban District, finishing as runners-up in the Uxbridge and District League Division I. In the next season 1931–32 they won the Uxbridge and District Premier League and Premier Cup.

Yiewsley (and West Drayton) returned to Star Meadow, Trout Lane, at the start of the 1933–34 season after a six-season absence playing home games on local recreational fields. They had joined the South-West Middlesex League Intermediate Division B and played their first home game of the season against N.P.L. on 21 October 1933, winning 7–1. Yiewsley and West Drayton finished the 1933–34 season as league champions and winners of the Intermediate Cup.

In the 1934–35 season the club's name reverted to Yiewsley F.C. Having gained promotion in the previous season, they played in the Premier Division of the South-West Middlesex League. The 1935–36 season saw Yiewsley's last game at Star Meadow which took place on 18 April 1936 with a 10–1 win against F.G. Minter's. For the 1936–37 season Yiewsley's new ground was on the Evelyn's estate, Falling Lane, where they were granted a 21-year lease. To mark the change Yiewsley reverted to their old colours of dark and light blue instead of black and white. Ten to twelve thousand people attended the Evelyn's Stadium opening ceremony and fete which took place on 22 August 1936. The first game of the 1936–37 season took place at Evelyn's on 29 August 1936 against Hayesco II in the South-West Middlesex Premier League, resulting in a 4–0 win. Yiewsley won the league and the Intermediate Cup that season and the next, winning the 1937–38 season by a clear eight points. In the 1938–39 season Yiewsley competed in the  South-West Middlesex Premier League and the newly created Middlesex County League, winning the Middlesex County League Senior Cup 1-0 against Deerfield and West Hendon on 3 May 1939. 

In the 1939–40 season Yiewsley attempted to play in the Spartan League Division II for the second time. They started the season with two away wins beating Apsley Reserves 8–4 on 26 August  and Harrow Town 4–2 on 30 August  before the league was abandoned at the start of the Second World War. In early October 1939 Yiewsley were transferred to the Western No 2 Group which was renamed the West Middlesex Combination League on 17 October 1939. Yiewsley's first game in the new league was away at Pinner on 21 October 1939 which ended in a 5–5 draw. Yiewsley ended the 1939–40 season as runners-up to Edgware Town. For the 1940–41 season the league was renamed the Middlesex Senior League. However Yiewsley tendered its resignation from the league on 9 September 1940 because of being unable to field a competitive team, as players and supporters were working weekends as part of the war effort. In the 1941–42 to 1943–44 seasons Yiewsley were able to field a team in the Middlesex Senior league and in the 1944–45 season also competed in the Great Western Combination League. 

In 1945–46 Yiewsley were finally successful in completing a season in the Spartan League. They competed in Diversion 1 Western Section, opening the season at Aylesbury on 15 September 1945 with a 5–3 defeat. Having finished runners-up in the 1948–49 season, in the 1949–50 season Yiewsley finished winners of the league, gaining promotion to the Spartan League Premier Division. They followed this by going on to win the championship play-off game against the Eastern Section winners Hertford Town 6–1. In the following 1950–51 season they won the Spartan Premier Division at the first attempt, clinching the title with a 2–1 win at Aylesbury, who finished the season in third place. In March 1951 Yiewsley were one of the 14 clubs who founded the Delphian League which was to commence from the following 1951–52 season. Yiewsley's first game in the new league took place on 18 August against Wembley at Vale Farm ending in a 1–0 defeat.  

In the 1954–55 season Yiewsley joined the Corinthian League, opening the season with a 1–0 win against Edgware Town on 21 August at their new ground, Leas Stadium in front of 2,600 spectators. Yiewsley had wanted a new ground for several years due to the limited facilities at the leased Evelyn's Stadium. In early 1946 a site was purchased. A Yiewsley F.C. 'New Ground Fund' was established to pay for the purchasing loan with many local individuals and businesses contributing. A 'Sports and Fete day' took place at Evelyn's on 23 July 1946 raising £320 for the fund. This brought the total raised to £600 towards a target of £1000. However it wasn't until the 1951–52 season that work began on the site of Leas Stadium. It was situated west of Evelyn's along Falling Lane and was named after a house there called 'The Leas'. Construction of the 10,000 capacity stadium took three years to complete at a cost of £7000. 

Yiewsley topped the Corinthian League in their third season, 1956–57. In the FA Cup that season Yiewsley drew 2–2 with Third Division Gillingham at the Leas Stadium in the first round. Gillingham went on to defeat Yiewsley 2–0 at Priestfield in the replay. In 1958 a decision was made to turn semi-professional, and the club joined the South-East zone of the Southern League. In November 1960 Jackie Milburn formerly of Newcastle United and England signed for Yiewsley, soon becoming Player-manager. He left in March 1963 when offered the manager's job at First Division Ipswich Town.

On 1 May 1964 the F.A. Council granted permission for Yiewsley to change their name to Hillingdon Borough F.C. This was done to reflect the local government reorganisation in London that was to see the formation of the London Borough of Hillingdon on 1 April 1965. The change of name saw their fortunes change, as in their second season they were promoted to the Premier Division of the Southern League after finishing runners up. Their most successful period followed over the next five years. In 1968–69 they finished runners-up to Cambridge United. In the following 1969–70 season, they reached the third round proper of the FA Cup beating Wimbledon and Luton Town before losing to Sutton United 4–1 in a replay at Gander Green Lane.  In the 2–1 win against Luton in the second round, the Leas Stadium had its highest official attendance with 9033 spectators. In the 1970–71 season, Hillingdon reached the FA Trophy final at Wembley playing Telford United in front of 29,500 spectators. Hillingdon led 2-0 at the interval but Telford staged a second half comeback scoring two goals in the last seven minutes to win 3–2.

These achievements were all under Jimmy Langley (left-back for Fulham, Queens Park Rangers and England), who was Player-manager between 1967 and 1971. Langley had been educated at Evelyn's school, next to Yiewsley's Evelyn's Stadium. At the age of fourteen he was the youngest player to play for the club. In the F.A. Trophy Final on 1 May 1971, Langley, known as a gentleman footballer, became the then oldest man to appear in a Cup Final at Wembley at the age of 42. Other notable managers of the club included Barry Fry, latterly of Birmingham City and Peterborough United.

The club failed to build on the success of the late 1960s and early 1970s. The 1980s saw Hillingdon entering financial difficulties and subsequent financial collapse. Hillingdon Borough's final game was at the Leas on 30 April 1983 against Dover ending with a 2–1 win. The club was wound up and the Leas Stadium sold in the summer of 1983. In the 1983–84 and 1984–85 seasons the club was able to continue playing under the name of Hillingdon F.C. However the final game at Leas Stadium was held on 23 April 1985 against Chatham Town in front of 350 spectators ending in a 1–0 defeat.

In the 1985–86 season Hillingdon merged with Burnham to form Burnham & Hillingdon F.C. playing home games at Burnham's Wymers Wood Road ground. The club ran for two seasons with this name before changing back to Burnham and continuing to play in the Southern league.

Leas Stadium had been sold to property developers who built a housing estate on the land. They honoured the club's history by naming the roads Leacroft Close, Newcombe Rise, Cousins (sic) Close and Milburn Drive.

Modern club
The name Hillingdon Borough was resurrected in 1990 when Bromley Park Rangers from the Chiltonian League took over the ground of Ruislip, with the help of four former directors from the old club, and changed their name. The newly named club then joined the Premier Division of the Spartan League for the start of the 1990–91 campaign. The club would then go on to finish Runners-up twice before the league merged with the South Midlands League to form the Spartan South Midlands Football League. The club was placed in the Premier South Division.

In 2006, Hillingdon Borough reached the FA Vase final at St. Andrews, Birmingham, after an 11-game qualification route starting in the competition as early as the 2nd qualifying round. In the final of the FA Vase the club lost 3–1 to Cheshire club Nantwich Town. Also in that year they finished 2nd in the Spartan South Midlands League Premier Division, losing on goal difference to Oxford City. However they were promoted due to continued restructuring of non-league football, joining the Southern League Division One South & West. During the 2007–08 season, captain Danny Tilbury led Steve Ringrose's side to lift the Errea Cup (Southern League Cup) with a 4–1 aggregate win against Premier side Clevedon Town. Following the departure of Steve Ringrose the club was transferred to the Isthmian League Division One North. The club struggled under new manager Steve Hale and in their first season in the Isthmian League they finished bottom of the division and were relegated back to the Spartan South Midlands League in 2009.

In recent years the club have had little stability in the managerial department and on and off the field. When Gamdoor Dhaliwal resigned as chairman the club were on the brink of liquidation until local businessman Mick Harris stepped in to save the club. Gary Meakin, aged 26 years old, took over in 2010 and was in the process of building a competitive team before swapping Hillingdon for Northwood in March 2011. Jesse Smith, an experienced coach on the Middlesex scene, was appointed as Meakin's successor before his departure in 2012 and achieved a 10th-place finish and a cup final in his only season in charge. Then it was the turn of 2005 Football Icon winner Sam Hurrell to take charge in September 2012, then only 24 years of age, alongside co-manager Jason O'Connor.

Following relegation from the Spartan South Midlands League Premier Division in 2015, the club appointed former Harefield United boss Ian Crane as their new manager. Crane had most recently been manager at A.F.C. Hayes before leaving in December 2014.

On 17 January 2017, the club released a statement via their Twitter account that the club would be pulling out of the division due to monetary troubles. However, former player Yannick Bolasie has since contacted the club, with the support of Everton, to help with the club's financial situation. At the end of the 2020–21 season they were transferred to Division One of the Combined Counties League.

Club staff

Ground

Hillingdon Borough play their home games at Middlesex Stadium, Breakspear Road, Ruislip, Middlesex, HA4 7SB.

Honours

Historic club

League honours
Southern Football League Division One South
 Runners-up (1): 1974–75
Southern Football League Premier Division
 Runners-up (1): 1968–69
Southern Football League Division One
 Runners-up (1): 1965–66
Corinthian League
 Champions (1): 1956–57
 Runners-up (1): 1955–56
Spartan League Premier Division
 Champions (1): 1950-51
Spartan League Western Section
 Champions (1): 1949–50
 Runners-up (1): 1948–49

Cup honours
Southern League Cup:
 Runners-Up (1): 1972–73
FA Trophy:
 Runners-Up (1): 1970–71

Modern club

League honours
Spartan South Midlands Football League Premier Division
 Runners-up (1): 2005–06
Spartan League
 Runners-up (2): 1995–96, 1996–97

Cup honours
FA Vase:
 Runners-Up (1): 2005–06
London Senior Cup:
 Runners-Up (1): 1996–97
Southern Football League Cup
 Winners (1): 2007–08
Spartan League Cup
 Winners (1): 1996–97

Club records

Historic club
Highest League Position: 2nd in Southern League 1968–69
FA Cup best performance: Third round 1969–70
FA Trophy best performance: Finalists 1970–71

Modern club
Highest League Position: 16th in Southern League Division One South & West, 2006–07
FA Cup best performance: Third qualifying round, 2007–08
FA Trophy best performance: Second qualifying round, 2007–08
FA Vase best performance: Finalists 2005–06

Former players

Former managers

References

External links
Club website

Football clubs in England
Sport in the London Borough of Hillingdon
Isthmian League
Association football clubs established in 1965
Southern Football League clubs
Delphian League
Corinthian League (football)
Football clubs in London
1965 establishments in England
Great Western Suburban League
Combined Counties Football League